Palawan Pawnshop – Palawan Express Pera Padala is a Philippine-based pawnshop and non-banking financial institution offering services such as pawn-broking, money remittance, insurance, bills payment, remit-to-account, corporate payout, collections, and electronic reloading. It is headquartered in Puerto Princesa, Palawan.

History
It was founded in 1985, originally owned by the Rodriguez family, with the intention of providing cash-based financial assistance to the common folk of Puerto Princesa. It would later be acquired by spouses Bobby Castro and the former Angelita Maligalig, two former activists and both coming from a military family background. Bobby had wanted to establish a business portfolio of his own apart from managing his father's business. After acquiring the business from the Rodriguez family for ₱40 thousand, its first outlet was established along Malvar Street in the city.

In 2021, digital cross-border payment service WorldRemit partnered with Palawan Pawnshop to increase its remittance network.

References

Pawn shops
Financial services companies of the Philippines
Philippine companies established in 1985
Financial services companies established in 1985
Retail companies established in 1985